Bath Film Festival, known as FilmBath, is a film festival established in 1991, in Bath, England, by members of the Bath Film Society. The organisation has expanded in duration, venues, and titles.  In 1997, it was registered as a non profit-distributing company and, in 2000, as a charitable organisation. The festival has also expanded its programme over the years to include workshops for festival-goers, live music accompaniments to silent cinema, and more recently, open-air cinema, starting in 2003 with a screening of E.T. in partnership with the Holburne Museum of Art.  Since its foundation, the festival has screened over 1000 films.

IMDb is a co-sponsor of the festival and of several festival awards.

Nicolas Roeg's 2007 film Puffball had its UK premiere at the festival.  In January 2014, a special screening of Martin Scorsese's The Last Temptation of Christ at Wells Cathedral (along with a companion screening of The Passion of Joan of Arc at Bath Abbey) provoked some controversy; the church defended its decision to allow the screening.

In 2014 Bath Film Festival's Executive Director Holly Tarquini founded the F-Rating which is awarded to films directed and/or written by women. In 2015 the F-Rating was adopted by dozens of independent film festivals and cinemas including The Barbican. In 2016 Holly Tarquini delivered a TEDx talk about the rating. In 2017, the keyword 'f-rated' was added to over 22,000 titles on IMDb.

References

External links
 Official Website for the Bath Film Festival
 Visit Bath

Film festivals in England
Film